Gorchaki is a rural locality (a village) in Mikyashevsky Selsoviet, Davlekanovsky District, Bashkortostan, Russia. The population was 120 as of 2010. There is 1 street.

Geography 
Gorchaki is located 24 km west of Davlekanovo (the district's administrative centre) by road. Akhunovo is the nearest rural locality.

References 

Rural localities in Davlekanovsky District